Safiabad (also Romanized as Şafīābād; also known as Safīel and Seyf) is a village in Eslamiyeh Rural District, in the Central District of Rafsanjan County, Kerman Province, Iran. At the 2006 census, its population was 191, in 49 families.

References 

Populated places in Rafsanjan County